The qualification for the 2020 Women's Olympic Handball Tournament assigned quota places to twelve teams: the hosts, the World champion, four continental champions and six teams from the World Olympic qualification tournaments respectively.

Qualification summary
{| class="wikitable" width=80%
|-
!width=30%|Qualification!!width=23%|Date!!width=22%|Host!!width=10%|Vacancies!!width=15%|Qualified
|-
| Host nation ||  |||| align="center"| 1 || 
|-
| 2018 European Championship || 29 November – 16 December 2018 ||  || align="center"| 1 ||  
|-
|2019 Pan American Games || 24–30 July 2019 ||  Lima || align="center" | 1 || 
|-
| 2019 Asian Qualification Tournament || 23–29 September 2019 ||  Chuzhou || align="center" | 1 || 
|-
| 2019 African Qualification Tournament || 26–29 September 2019 ||  Dakar || align="center" | 1 || 
|-
| 2019 World Championship || 29 November – 15 December 2019 ||  || align="center"| 1 || 
|-
| rowspan=3|2020 IHF Women's Olympic Qualification Tournaments || rowspan=3|19–21 March 2021 ||  Llíria || align="center"| 2 || 
|-
|  Győr || align="center"| 2 || 
|-
|  Podgorica || align="center"| 2 || 
|-
! Total !! colspan="2"| !! 12 !!
|}

Legend for qualification type

Host country

World Championship

Continental qualification

Europe

America

Asia
The tournament was held in Chuzhou, China from 23 to 29 September 2019.

All times are local (UTC+8).

Africa
The tournament was held in Dakar, Senegal from 26 to 29 September 2019.

All times are local (UTC+0).

Olympic Qualification Tournaments

2020 Olympic Qualification Tournament #1

2020 Olympic Qualification Tournament #2

2020 Olympic Qualification Tournament #3

References

Women's qualification
Handball Women
2020 in women's handball
2021 in women's handball
Olympics